Blind in Paradise is the third studio album by hard rock band Takara released in 1998 on Point Music & Saraya Recordings.

Track listing
 "Take U Down"
 "Your Love 2night"
 "Fly 2 Your Arms"
 "Love Is Gone"
 "What Do U Want From Me"
 "Time Waits 4 No One"
 "Blind In Paradise"
 "Don't Wanna Be Alone"
 "No Love's Enough"
 "Lookin' Out"
 "Say U'll Stay"
 "Awake & Dreaming"

Personnel
Jeff Scott Soto – lead vocals
Neal Grusky – guitar
Carl Demarco – bass
Eric Ragno – keyboards
Robert Duda – drums
Bob Daisley - bass on track 8
Bernie Tavis - violin on track 8

External links
 Official Website

1998 albums
Takara (band) albums